WYCC (channel 20) was a public television station in Chicago, Illinois, United States. It was last owned by not-for-profit broadcasting entity Window to the World Communications, Inc., alongside PBS member station WTTW (channel 11) and classical music radio station WFMT (98.7 FM). WYCC's operations were housed with WTTW and WFMT in the Renée Crown Public Media Center, located at 5400 North Saint Louis Avenue (adjacent to the main campus of Northeastern Illinois University) in the city's North Park neighborhood; WYCC and WTTW shared transmitter facilities atop the Willis Tower on South Wacker Drive in the Chicago Loop. WYCC previously maintained studios at Kennedy–King College on South Union Avenue and Halsted Parkway in the Englewood neighborhood.

Channel 20 was started as a secondary channel for educational programming from WTTW in 1965, under the call sign WXXW. It continued in this role until it was shuttered in 1974. After being transferred to a consortium of educational institutions but never returned to air, the City Colleges of Chicago obtained the license in 1982 and brought it back to air in February 1983 as WYCC ("We are Your City Colleges"). It served as a secondary public station in Chicago, where WTTW was the primary PBS station, and focused on instructional programs and output from independent producers. The City Colleges sold the underlying spectrum for $16 million in 2016, and after shelving initial plans to shut down at that time, in October 2017, WYCC dropped its long-running affiliation with PBS to air MHz Worldview; a month later, on November 27, it went off the air completely and was sold to Window to the World, essentially becoming a subchannel of WTTW with a separate license, airing MHz Worldview and then First Nations Experience (FNX).

Window to the World Communications relinquished the license of WYCC, with an effective date of June 1, 2022. With the license defunct, WTTW replaced FNX with the World Channel, now mapping to channel 11.6.

History

Prior attempts to activate channel 20
On the heels of the Federal Communications Commission (FCC)'s recent lifting of its moratorium on new television station applications (the result of the agency's passage of the Sixth Report & Order of 1952) as well as the opening of additional channels on the UHF band, WIND Inc., a joint venture between the Chicago Daily News and the family of Ralph J. Atlass—one-time owners of radio stations WBBM (780 AM) and WIND (560 AM)—petitioned the FCC for a construction permit to build a television station on UHF channel 20, which would be licensed to nearby Gary, Indiana. The group also applied for and received the call letters WIND-TV for their new station, which was never signed on under their purview. On November 8, 1956, the Westinghouse Electric Corporation purchased the construction permit and WIND radio for $5.3 million.

UHF stations struggled mightily during the 1950s, with many shutting down outright, due partly to the fact that manufacturers did not include UHF tuners in television sets (an issue that was remedied when the FCC made these tuners a requirement for sets made from 1964 onward through its passage of the All-Channel Receiver Act). By the end of the decade, Westinghouse Broadcasting (which never ran an independent television station) had soured on the idea of launching a station in the Chicago market. After the FCC sent 50 permitholders letters in February 1960 inquiring as to their plans for the station, WIND-TV was among five that were deleted at the owners' request.

WXXW
First conceived in 1953 and debuting in September 1955 as Chicago's first non-commercial educational television station, WTTW began to experience growing pains by the early 1960s. Gradually moving away from its original mission of providing classroom instructional courses as more and more of its broadcast day was filled first with programming from National Educational Television (NET) and those distributed by other member stations, the idea of a second station seemed like the perfect answer to provide additional sources for the displaced educational programming. In October 1962, the FCC, at the request of WTTW's owner, then known as the Chicago Educational Television Association (CETA), changed channel 20's status to reserved noncommercial. The CETA filed for the construction permit on January 18, 1963, receiving it on September 23.

According to the quarterly WTTW Channel 11 News program guide from Winter 1963, hopes were high for the new station. Intending to devote its entire schedule to instructional programming (including the already established College of the Air telecourses), possibilities for the station—to be given the call letters WXXW—included special police training programs; police bulletins (including lineups); public health instruction in pre-natal and post-natal care; instructional programs for election judges; training for Army, Navy and Air Force reserve units; civil defense disaster training; programs for unskilled workers; professional information services for physicians and dentists; and seminar programs for various other professional groups. The new WXXW would also engage in rebroadcasting of the Midwest Program on Airborne Television Instruction school programs at times more convenient to Chicago schools than their initial broadcast from airplanes flying high above Indiana.

The WXXW antenna had been intended to be placed on the Field Building, from which WTTW had broadcast, but a proposed skyscraper to be built by First National Bank of Chicago created possible multipath interference issues for both stations. 1000 Lake Shore Plaza offered free antenna space to both stations; the antenna switch set WXXW back from a planned September 1964 debut. However, the planned expansion of educational television for schools was carried out by retaining some instructional programs on WTTW and purchasing time on the other UHF station in the city, WCIU-TV (channel 26).

On September 20, 1965, WXXW signed on as Chicago's second UHF television station and second non-commercial outlet. However the station, known as "the Classroom of the Air" and financed entirely from school reimbursements for educational programming, was essentially a failure. Plagued by a weak signal and a schedule filled with what former WTTW station manager Edward Morris called "talking heads and a blackboard", WXXW limped along until it quietly went dark in 1974. Throughout its entire existence, WXXW was only able to transmit in black-and-white, making it and commercial independent station WCIU-TV (channel 26) the only television stations in the Chicago market that had not transitioned to color broadcasts in the early 1970s. The monochrome transmissions were just another nail in the station's coffin. When the transmitter broke down in 1974, channel 20 was plunged into silence lasting nearly nine years. The station had held a construction permit to move to the John Hancock Center since 1972.

Becoming WYCC
In 1977, a consortium known as the Chicago Metropolitan Higher Education Council acquired the long-dark WXXW license from WTTW general manager Bill McCarter (again, the license was allegedly purchased for $1, making it the cheapest television license ever in the Chicago area) and changed its call letters to WCME. The consortium, which was led by City Colleges chancellor Oscar Shabat, had earlier examined the purchase of the partially built but unused WCFL-TV (channel 38) because channel 20 would have needed a new Sears Tower antenna installed. In addition to the city colleges, the Metropolitan Higher Education Council also included Chicago State University, Governors State University, Northeastern Illinois University, and University of Illinois at Chicago Circle.

The consortium projected a mid-1979 start date to return channel 20 to the air after obtaining the license; little headway was made, and the consortium offered to transfer the license to the City Colleges in 1981. When it returned to the air as WYCC on February 17, 1983, the station began airing telecourses in such titles as "History of the American People from 1865", "Descriptive Astronomy 1", and "Introduction to Business". It broadcast for 52 hours a week with an annual budget of just $275,000 and 20 staffers; Elynne Chaplik Aleskow, the general manager, was the first woman to hold that post at a Chicago TV station. By 1987, the station had an annual budget of $1 million—$300,000 from the Corporation for Public Broadcasting and the rest from the City Colleges—and was reputedly the only PBS station to never have aired a pledge drive. It was on the air for 18 hours a day, though its only regular programming produced in-house was a weekly talk show with the City Colleges chancellor plus specials, news updates, and program promotions. The audience for its college courses had increased to 10,000 by 1991 and 15,000 by 1993.

More local programming
In 1992, the City Colleges closed City-Wide College, the extension division under which WYCC was operated, with Harold Washington College absorbing most of its functions, though the studios were located at Daley College. Four years later, the station began to introduce its own local program productions. Irma Blanco, at the time a morning co-host on Chicago radio, hosted the arts program Absolute Artistry. Other programs included the education magazine Educate! and profiles of Chicago personalities on First from Chicago.

In 1999, it was proposed to move WYCC to a rebuilt Kennedy-King College in the city's Englewood neighborhood. This materialized eight years later, when the new facility opened in 2007; it was also part of a high-definition production pilot for PBS. The work also coincided with the station's digital television transition. WYCC began broadcasting in digital on May 1, 2003, and converted completely to digital on April 16, 2009. In its modern history, the station featured a variety of programming on three digital subchannels, including those provided by PBS, those produced locally, and international news and educational programs.

Spectrum auction
In 2015, the Chicago Tribune editorial board recommended WYCC sell its license in the forthcoming spectrum auction. After initial refusal, mayor Rahm Emanuel authorized the City Colleges to sell the license.

In April 2017, WYCC sold its spectrum for $15,959,957; at the time, the station indicated that it would enter into a post-auction channel sharing agreement. Not only was the bid much lower than many had expected, but the potential windfall would be further eroded by continuing expenses, as the station's lease for antenna space at the John Hancock Center ran through 2029. On September 13, 2017, WYCC announced in a letter to contributors that it would shut down October 25, 2017; most of the station's staff had been laid off following the conclusion of the auction. However, prior to September 22, 2017, WTTW approached WYCC with a channel-sharing agreement to stay on the air. WYCC then announced in a letter to employees that it would remain on the air through November 24; if a channel-sharing agreement was reached, operation of WYCC's channels would be handled by WTTW, with a tentative plan to use "a combination of WYCC and WTTW brands and programming". The deadline to file a plan with the FCC was November 24, 2017. In 2016, WYCC had an annual budget of $8.2 million, of which the City Colleges provided $5.7 million. The station lost $732,000 in 2016 in its non-operating budget, despite funding from the Corporation for Public Broadcasting, the state of Illinois, and private donors.

Sale to WTTW and closure
On October 25, 2017, a notice was posted on the station's website saying that subchannel 20.1 would broadcast MHz WorldView, though the station announced there would be no changes to the 20.2 or 20.3 subchannels. WorldView, which offered international news programming, had been carried on a subchannel of WYCC since 2010; the 20.2 subchannel had been airing FNX since November 1, 2013. WTTW began accepting WYCC members.

On December 7, 2017, Window to the World Communications, owner of WTTW, announced that it was seeking to purchase WYCC from the City Colleges of Chicago, in a move that would put the two stations back under the same corporate umbrella. However, the license assignment application was not submitted to the FCC until late January 2018, which disclosed that Window to the World Communications would acquire the WYCC license for $100,000. As part of the purchase, WYCC entered into a channel sharing agreement with WTTW. The sale was approved by the FCC on March 13, 2018, and was completed on April 20. As a part of MHz WorldView's closure on March 1, 2020, WTTW planned to move World programming to channel 20.1, while its original channel slot (11.3) would have broadcast Create. However, WTTW changed its plan to provide FNX programming instead.

In May 2022, Window to the World Communications filed an application to dissolve the WTTW-WYCC channel sharing agreement on June 1, 2022, announcing that the WYCC license would be surrendered after that date. The license was canceled on June 2, 2022.

Programming

Educational programming
Through its ownership by the City Colleges of Chicago, WYCC provided distance learning courses as part of its late night schedule, which could be credited towards an associate degree—when viewed—at any of the City Colleges campuses. The colleges also used WYCC to air informational programs for neighborhood outreach and community service purposes.

As a PBS member station, WYCC also provided a relatively limited schedule of children's programming provided by the service as well as through independent distributors such as American Public Television, mainly airing on weekday mornings.

Local programming
After initiating the production of regular local programs in 1996, WYCC continued to create and air local public affairs programming until 2017. A televised version of political talk show Beyond the Beltway, which also airs nationally on radio, ran on WYCC until the end. In 2013, WYCC debuted In the Loop, a half-hour weekly public affairs show on Thursday evenings, hosted by Barbara Pinto and Chris Bury (both of whom formerly served as correspondents for ABC News); Robin Robinson and Lauren Cohn (both former anchors at WFLD) joined the program as rotating co-hosts starting in September 2015.

The station formerly produced the public affairs and editorial program Off 63rd with Garrard McClendon. Airing on Thursday evenings, and funded by the McCormick Foundation and the Field Foundation, the show was hosted by professor and author Dr. Garrard McClendon. It also produced The Professors, a half-hour weekly program on Sunday mornings featuring a panel of professors from the City Colleges of Chicago campuses discussing education-related issues.

The station also aired Pritzker Military Presents from 2006 until 2017.

How-to programming
In 2010, the station began incorporating many "how to" shows on its weekday afternoon and Saturday midday schedules, featuring a mix of sewing, quilting, cooking, art/painting, gardening, home improvement, and travel programs from American Public Television and other distributors.

International programming
WYCC broadcast numerous international programs.

WYCC carried mystery programs from PBS' anthology series Masterpiece, as well as twice weekly airing of those produced by BBC Worldwide Americas (such as DCI Banks) in prime time on Tuesdays and Saturdays. Several British series have aired on the station, including The Café and Lead Balloon.

In 2010, the station began carrying reruns of Canadian sitcom The Red Green Show. WYCC also served as the Chicago-area broadcaster of Out of Ireland. The station formerly carried other British and Irish imports including Tartan TV (which focuses on Scotland), Monarch of the Glen, Last of the Summer Wine, Are You Being Served?, New Tricks, Monty Python's Flying Circus, the Irish comedic soap opera Ballykissangel, and (in 2010), the British serial drama Touching Evil.

WYCC and WTTW show a similar number of scripted British programmes, with both airing Antiques Roadshow and Masterpiece, though at different air dates. WYCC has aired the BBC One programme Lark Rise to Candleford (which began in the UK in 2008) since 2009; and Midsomer Murders (which first aired in the UK in 1997) in November 2010. Mystery series presented on the station expanded in 2013 and 2014 to include Vera, DCI Banks, and the Australian series Miss Fisher's Murder Mysteries. In the late 2010s, WYCC expanded their format with German, Swedish, and Norwegian mystery shows. With its large variety of mystery programs, WYCC runs two-day mystery marathons on some holidays, tied with fundraising.

News programming
WYCC carried local news programs produced by undergraduate and graduate students from the Medill School of Journalism at Northwestern University, with students from the City Colleges of Chicago contributing in the production of these shows. WYCC also produced programs for the Illinois gubernatorial and Assembly elections during the 2010 and 2012 fall election seasons.

In the early 2010s, WYCC altered its program lineup, acquiring new program offerings from the BBC and using the English language international news shows available to offer news and opinions not provided elsewhere, particularly for viewers who watch broadcast television over-the-air in the Chicago area market. The station offered comprehensive international news coverage and national news discussion programs from DW TV's Journal, France 24, NHK Newsline, RT News and Euronews. The station also broadcasts news/talk shows programs distributed for public television syndication such as those hosted by Charlie Rose and Tavis Smiley.

In 2013, WYCC began airing the PBS series Just Seen It, featuring various entertainment industry people providing reviews of movies and television programs, with a quick format reflecting the original Siskel/Ebert movie review program At the Movies, recommending viewers to see, skip or stream the reviewed media.

WYCC was one of the very few PBS stations not to air PBS Newshour, as WTTW airs these newscasts.

References

First Nations Experience affiliates
Television channels and stations established in 1983
YCC
1983 establishments in Illinois
Television channels and stations disestablished in 2022
2022 disestablishments in Illinois
Defunct television stations in the United States
City Colleges of Chicago
YCC